High School DxD is an anime series adapted from the light novels of the same title written by Ichiei Ishibumi and illustrated by Miyama-Zero. Produced by TNK, directed by Tetsuya Yanagisawa, and written by Takao Yoshioka, the anime aired on TV Tokyo's satellite channel AT-X from January 6 to March 23, 2012. Set during the struggle among the devils, fallen angels, and angels, the story follows the adventures of Issei Hyodo. Issei is a perverted high school student who is killed by his first date, who is revealed to be a fallen angel. He is revived by Rias Gremory, who is a crimson-haired school beauty that is actually a devil, and becomes her servant. The first season adapts material from the first two volumes of the light novels and a few side stories from Volume 8.

The second season, titled , aired from July 7 to September 22, 2013. The third season, aired from April 4 to June 20, 2015. The third season's first ten episodes adapts material from the fifth to the seventh volumes of the light novels, while the last two episodes form an original self-contained story arc. This would be the final work by TNK on High School DxD due to creative differences between Director Tetsuya Yanagisawa, script writer Takao Yoshioka and original series writer Ichiei Ishibumi. The fourth season, High School DxD Hero, aired from April 10 to July 3, 2018, adapts material from the ninth and tenth volumes of the light novel and is produced by Passione, directed by Yoshifumi Sueda, and written by Kenji Konuta. During production of this season Ishibumi had the Passione staff read nearly all of the light novels so that they don't miss any inaccuracies and warned them off taking any creative liberties with the material like TNK had.

Six DVD and Blu-ray compilation volumes of the first season were released by Media Factory between March 21, 2012 and August 29, 2012. Each contained an OVA short entitled  and other bonus material. An OVA episode that is listed as episode 13 was released with the limited edition of the 13th light novel volume on September 6, 2012 on Blu-ray. The script was handled by Ichiei Ishibumi, who is the author of the light novels. Another OVA episode that is listed as episode 14 is written by Ishibumi and was bundled with the limited edition release of the 15th light novel volume on May 31, 2013 on Blu-ray. The first DVD and Blu-ray compilations of High School DxD New was released by Media Factory on September 25, 2013. The sixth and final compilation was released on February 26, 2014.

In North America, the anime series is licensed by Funimation for simulcast on their website and home video releases on DVD and Blu-ray. In Australia, the series is licensed by Madman Entertainment, but it was not released in New Zealand after the Office of Film and Literature Classification (OFLC) decided against releasing it because "it encourages and legitimizes the pursuit of young persons as viable adult sexual partners". Funimation released the first season on August 20, 2013, the second season on November 11, 2014, and the third season on September 6, 2016.

The original score for the series was composed by Ryosuke Nakanishi. Ten pieces of theme music are used for the series: five opening themes and five ending themes. The opening theme for the first season is titled "Trip -Innocent of D-" and performed by J-pop group Larval Stage Planning. The ending theme is titled "STUDYxSTUDY" and performed by the voice actress unit StylipS, which consists of Arisa Noto, Yui Ogura, Kaori Ishihara, and Maho Matsunaga. The opening theme for the first arc of the second season is titled "Sympathy" and performed by Larval Stage Planning. The opening theme for the second arc of the second season is titled  and performed by Zaq. The ending theme for the second arc of the second season is titled  and performed by the Occult Research Club Girls, which also features Risa Taneda and Ayane Sakura as their characters Xenovia and Gasper. For the third season, the opening theme is titled "Bless Your Name" and performed by ChouCho. The ending theme is titled "Give Me Secret" and performed by StylipS.

Series overview

Episodes

High School DxD (2012)

High School DxD New (2013)

High School DxD Born (2015)

High School DxD Hero (2018)

Notes

See also
 Ichiei Ishibumi
 High School DxD characters
 High School DxD light novels

References
General
 
 
 
Specific

External links
  
  at FUNimation
 

High School DxD episode lists
E